The W. B. Hibbs and Company Building, also known as the Folger Building, is an historic structure located at 725 15th Street, Northwest, Washington, D.C., in Downtown Washington, D.C.

History
Jules Henri de Sibour designed the building, which was completed in 1906.  

It was listed on the District of Columbia Inventory of Historic Sites, on November 8, 1964.
It was listed on the National Register of Historic Places in 1991.

References

External links

1906 establishments in Washington, D.C.
Beaux-Arts architecture in Washington, D.C.
Commercial buildings completed in 1906
District of Columbia Inventory of Historic Sites
Office buildings in Washington, D.C.
Office buildings on the National Register of Historic Places in Washington, D.C.